The Instituto Superior de Ciências Policiais e Segurança Interna (Portuguese for Higher Institute of Police Sciences and Homeland Security) is a Portuguese higher education institution, a police university institute or Police academy of the PSP - Polícia de Segurança Pública. It is located in Lisbon, Portugal.

See also
Higher education in Portugal
Portugal

External links
Instituto Superior de Ciências Policiais e Segurança Interna

Law enforcement in Portugal
Higher education in Portugal